Marie Hager (1872–1947) was a German artist.

Biography 
Hager was born on 20 March 1872 in Penzlin, Germany. Hager exhibited regularly and was often commissioned to create specific city- or town-scapes. She was a member of the Allgemeinen Deutschen Künstlergenossenschaft (General German Artists' Cooperative), the Vereins Berliner Künstlerinnen (Association of Berlin Women Artists), and the Mecklenburger Künstlerbundes (Mecklenburg Artists Association). She died on 25 April 1947 in Burg Stargard.

Legacy
In 1991 her home at Dewitzer Chaussee 17, Burg Stargard, along with more than 30 of Hager's landscape paintings were donated to the town by Hager's niece. In 1996 the Marie Hager House was created as a memorial  and gallery for Hager's work.

Gallery

References

External links

1872 births
1947 deaths
19th-century German women artists
20th-century German women artists